Raymond Pearce (29 September 1916 – 29 August 1975) was an Australian rules footballer who played with St Kilda in the Victorian Football League (VFL).

Pearce enlisted in the Australian Army in February 1944, playing two games for St Kilda while serving in the Australian Supply Depot Platoon.

Notes

External links 

1916 births
1975 deaths
Australian rules footballers from Tasmania
St Kilda Football Club players
North Hobart Football Club players